Moundadan Chetty or Chetti is an unclassified Southern Dravidian language of India spoken by Moundadan Chetti community in the Nilgiri district of Tamilnadu and in the Wayanad district of Kerala, India. Its highest lexical similarity is with Badaga, which one calculation put at 57%, and it has somewhat lower similarities (47%–41%) with Kannada, Malayalam, Tamil and Wayanadan Chetti. The people have requested the Tamil Nadu government to recognize them as distinct.

References

Dravidian languages
Mixed languages